Legaspi is a surname, a variant of Spanish Legazpí. Notable people with the surname include:
Ann Brithany Legaspi (born 1998), Filipino. 
Cassy Legaspi (born 2001), Filipino-American commercial model, actress, performer, TV Host and daughter of Zoren Legaspi
 Cesar Legaspi (1917–1994), Filipino national artist
 Ireneo Legaspi (died 2006), Filipino professional golfer
 Julián Legaspi (born 1973), Uruguayan-Peruvian actor
 Leonardo Legaspi (born 1935), Filipino archbishop 
 Zoren Legaspi (born 1972), Filipino actor  and television director
 Randy Gerard Legaspi Santiago (born 1960), Filipino actor, singer, producer

Fictional characters:
 Kim Legaspi, psychiatrist in TV medical drama series ER

Other Names Include-

 Miguel López de Legazpi (1502–1572), A Spanish conquistador who founded the Spanish colony in the Philippines
 Legazpi (disambiguation)

Basque-language surnames